Tetrathemis denticauda is a species of dragonfly in the family Libellulidae. It is found in the Democratic Republic of the Congo and Uganda. Its natural habitat is subtropical or tropical moist lowland forests. It is threatened by habitat loss.

References

Sources

Libellulidae
Insects described in 1854
Taxa named by Frederic Charles Fraser
Taxonomy articles created by Polbot